NGC 995 is a lenticular galaxy located in the constellation Andromeda about 178 million light years from the Milky Way. It was discovered by the French astronomer Édouard Stephan in 1871.

See also 
 List of NGC objects (1–1000)

References 

0995
Lenticular galaxies
Andromeda (constellation)
010008